Sturgeon Lake is a lake in the Kawartha Lakes region of Ontario, Canada. It is part of the Trent-Severn Waterway. The lake is Y shaped and has the communities of Fenelon Falls, Lindsay, Sturgeon Point and Bobcaygeon at the north-west, south, central and north-east points of the Y respectively.

Inflow and Outflow

The Scugog River flows into the lake at the southern apex.  Cameron Lake also flows into this lake, via the Fenelon River at the north-western extreme. Emily Creek empties into the lake at the middle south.

The lake outflow is through the Big Bob and Little Bob channels of the Bobcaygeon River at the north-east of the lake.

Fish species

Game fish species include large and small mouth bass, muskie, and walleye.

See also
List of lakes in Ontario

Sources

Atlas of Canada topographic maps 31D7 and 31D10 retrieved 2007-11-06

Lakes of Kawartha Lakes